The Russian Boxing Federation (RBF) is the governing body of both Olympic-style and professional boxing in Russia. The Federation was founded on 1 February 1992 after the dissolution of the USSR Boxing Federation. The RBF is the member of the International Boxing Association and European Boxing Confederation.

The IBA banned athletes from Russia from competing in international competitions starting on 4 March 2022 duento the Russian invasion of Ukraine. Later that month, the Federation stated its direct support for the ongoing invasion of Ukraine, and stated: "The entire boxing community of Russia expresses its full confidence and support to the President of the Russian Federation Vladimir Vladimirovich Putin!"

Umar Kremlev has been the IBA president since 2017.

Controversy

Olympics 2016 Rio, Brazil 
During the 2016 Olympic Games several bouts involving Russian boxers seemed to be judged in favour of the Russian athlete, when it was clear to many they had lost. Bantamweight Vladimir Nikitin was given a unanimous decision against Ireland's world champion Michael Conlan in the quarterfinal of the tournament, with judges all scoring for the Russian in rounds one and three. Afterwards, in an irate television interview, Conlan claimed AIBA were cheats and had been paid to fix fights. In order to reach the quarterfinal bout with Conlan, Nikitin was controversially awarded the win by split decision when he fought Thailand's Chatchai Butdee. According to the Bangkok Post, Butdee was quoted as saying, "I should have won the fight. I think I was more on target. I do not really understand the judges' decisions."

The day after the quarterfinal AIBA denied these allegations; however, they removed several Judges and Referees for the panel for the rest of the games over irregularities in scoring. They also stated decisions would stand.

References

Russia
Boxing in Russia
Amateur boxing organizations